First Jersey Credit Union was a federally insured, state chartered credit union operating from two branches in Passaic County, New Jersey. It was involuntarily liquidated by the New Jersey Department of Banking and Insurance and the National Credit Union Association on February 28, 2018, and USAlliance Federal Credit Union absorbed the majority of FJCU's assets.

History
First Jersey was originally chartered in 1929. The credit union converted from a multi-SEG credit union to a community credit union on 18 April 2005. They were a credit union involved with financing taxi medallions.

References

Companies based in Passaic County, New Jersey
Banks established in 1929
Credit unions based in New Jersey
1929 establishments in New Jersey